Oundle School is a  public school (English private boarding and day school) for pupils 11–18 situated in the market town of Oundle in Northamptonshire, England. The school has been governed by the Worshipful Company of Grocers of the City of London since its foundation by Sir William Laxton in 1556. The school's alumni – known as Old Oundelians – include renowned entrepreneurs, scientists, politicians, military figures and sportspeople.

Oundle has eight boys' houses, five girls' houses, a day house, a junior house and a junior day house. Together these accommodate more than 1100 pupils, generally between the ages of 11 and 18. It is the third-largest boarding school in England after Eton and Millfield.

The current Headmistress is Sarah Kerr-Dineen, who in 2015 became the first woman to lead the school.

The school is a member of the Headmasters' and Headmistresses' Conference.

History
The school was founded by Sir William Laxton and originally known as Laxton Grammar School. Laxton had been eight times Master of the Worshipful Company of Grocers and was Lord Mayor of the City of London in 1544. After Laxton's death in 1556, his will decreed the founding of a school for the local boys of Oundle, which was to be maintained by the Worshipful Company of Grocers. There had been a school on the site since at least 1485, at which Laxton himself was educated.

The size and reputation of Laxton Grammar School rose gradually in the following centuries such that by the mid-nineteenth century, many of the school's pupils had been sent from around the country to receive their education in Oundle. In 1876 the decision was made by the Grocers to divide the school into Oundle School and Laxton Grammar School. Laxton Grammar School was to continue to educate boys from Oundle and its surrounding villages, while Oundle School was to accept the sons of gentlemen from further afield.

It is during this period that Oundle rose to prominence as an English public school, which can be largely attributed to F. W. Sanderson in his role as headmaster from 1892 until his death in 1922. When Sanderson joined Oundle he found a  minor country boarding school; by the time of his death, the school had become the leading establishment for science and engineering education. The success of Sanderson can be attributed to his educational ethos; he believed in teaching pupils what they wanted to learn and as a result helped to introduce subjects such as science, modern languages and engineering to the English public school curriculum.

A major development came about in 1990 when Oundle admitted girls for the first time. In the year 2000 the decision was made by the school's governing body to re-unite Oundle School and Laxton School as a single educational establishment under the common name Oundle School, with Laxton House becoming the day house.

Present day
Oundle has 835 boarders and 235 day pupils. It is the third largest independent boarding school in England, after Eton in Berkshire and Millfield in Somerset.  The various school buildings, some of which date from the 15th century, are scattered around the market town, with the Cloisters acting as the nucleus of the school community.

The Good Schools Guide described the school as a "Popular, well oiled, well heeled co-educational boarding school which is riding high". Pupils obtain strong results at GCSE and A Level. In their 2013 A Levels pupils achieved 89.1% A* to B grades, with over 60% of grades either A* or A. In the year 2016, 28 pupils achieved 10 or more A* results in their GCSE examinations, with 89% of all results awarded being A* or A. Many pupils go on to study at Oxbridge; the overwhelming majority continue to Russell Group universities. In 2019, 48% of pupils scored A*-A for their A-Levels examination, whereas 79% scored A*-A for their GCSEs.

The school promotes the practice of Christian values and maintains links with the Church of England by celebrating the major events of the Christian calendar. All pupils who board are required to attend services in the school chapel three times a week: one midweek lunch time service, Friday hymn practice, and the Sunday service. Pupils of other faiths are free to worship according to their own beliefs but must still attend chapel with the rest of the school.

The school has an extensive programme of voluntary clubs and societies (approaching 50 in number), which range from poetry and debating to croquet and wine tasting. Each academic subject also has its own society which organises evening lectures from guest speakers throughout the year; these can be either directly related to the syllabus or simply to broaden interest in the subject. A new subject, Trivium, gives Third Form pupils timetabled engagement with extension topics for their own sake, using methods of thought drawn from the traditional liberal arts. Quadrivium is also an option for pupils in the Lower Sixth to study, similar to trivium taught in the Third Form. Outside term time pupils are given the opportunity to participate in the countless regular school trips which explore all corners of the globe. These include history trips to major European cities, language exchanges in Europe and Asia, charity work in Africa, AAAS conventions and politics trips in America, natural history expeditions to Antarctica, and many more.

Sport is considered to be an essential part of school life and while there exists a multitude of sports to choose from, the emphasis remains on traditional team sports such as rugby, hockey, cricket, rowing and soccer for boys, and hockey, netball and tennis for girls. Oundle performs particularly strongly in independent school rugby, cricket, and girls' hockey. A large proportion of the school gathers to support the 1st XV rugby team on the Two Acre during the Michaelmas and Christmas quarters. The school's greatest sporting rivalry is with Uppingham School, while other rivalries include Harrow School, Radley College, Stamford School and Rugby School. The school sends regular rugby, cricket and hockey tours to countries all around the world, while the social 'Ramblers' cricket team is known in the school for its tours of the U.K. and the Caribbean. The Oundle Rovers Cricket Club (made up of Old Oundelians) plays in The Cricketer Cup and hosts its own cricket week at the school. The Rovers have won the cup three times and are fourth in the all-time order of merit.

Like sport, music plays a vital role within school life for many pupils, and over 60% of pupils regularly practise a musical instrument while at Oundle. The school offers an extensive range of groups, bands, orchestras and choirs which cater for many musical tastes. Such is the success of music at Oundle that in recent years many pupils have gone on to receive musical or choral scholarships from Oxbridge, while school bands and choirs have gone on to perform concerts across the UK, Europe and Asia. Musical and non-musical pupils are encouraged to get involved in the house shout and part song competitions in the Lent term which are independently judged and contested fiercely. Possibly the greatest success in the practice of music at the school is its rock society, which can count the likes of Bruce Dickinson among its earliest members. 'Roc-Soc' has been running since the 1970s and promotes the independent formation of popular music bands which have their own dedicated concerts towards the end of every term. The experimental/industrial music pioneers Throbbing Gristle played at the school in March 1980. 

Oundle School has the largest Combined Cadet Force of any school in the country which plays an important role in both the development of pupils as well as in the community, for example in the annual Remembrance Day service held in St Peter's Church. The CCF offers pupils the opportunity to practise their leadership skills whether on parade at school, on the termly field weekends, or on the annual camps. The school has a strong tradition of serving the community with many pupils opting to provide assistance in the local area, or Community Action as an alternative to CCF. There are a broad range of Community Action options available in the Oundle area which cater not only for the needs of the local community but also for the extra-curricular interests of the pupils. Many pupils choose to undertake the Duke of Edinburgh Award Scheme which provides an ideal combination of the skills they acquire during CCF and Community Action. Every summer since 1982 sixth formers and former pupils have run the Oundle School Mencap holiday, a residential holiday for children with a range of learning disabilities and now a highly respected charity in its own right.

The school has ties with the Laxton Junior School, for primary school pupils, some of whom continue their secondary education as pupils at the senior school. A modern building for Laxton Junior was completed in 2003, which allowed the school to double its intake.

In November 2005 the school was found to have taken part in a cartel of price fixing among public schools. However, Mrs. Jean Scott, the head of the Independent Schools Council, said that independent schools had always been exempt from anti-cartel rules applied to business, were following a long-established procedure in sharing the information with each other, and that they were unaware of the change to the law (on which they had not been consulted). She wrote to John Vickers, the OFT Director General, saying, "They are not a group of businessmen meeting behind closed doors to fix the price of their products to the disadvantage of the consumer. They are schools that have quite openly continued to follow a long-established practice because they were unaware that the law had changed."

Oundle won the Tatler Public School of the Year Award in 2018.

Facilities

Oundle School's facilities include the following:
 Teaching Facilities. There are teaching buildings located throughout the town which house classrooms, studios and science and language laboratories. Many lessons take place in the Cloisters which are located in the heart of the town, and other main teaching buildings include the Adamson Centre, the Gascoigne, the Needham, Old Dryden, the Patrick Centre and SciTec.
 Sporting Facilities. The school has numerous sporting facilities which cater for a wide variety of different sports. Among these are four sand-filled astroturf pitches, a six lane synthetic athletics track, a swimming pool and over twenty tennis courts. The Sports Centre houses two fully equipped sports halls, indoor squash and fives facilities, a climbing wall and well equipped gymnasia. All of these have been rebuilt or refurbished in recent years. There are also extensive playing fields and boating facilities on the nearby River Nene, as well as sailing at Rutland Sailing Club.
 Various CCF buildings including two shooting ranges. There are a number of Combined Cadet Force (CCF) buildings including the Armoury (the main administrative building and rifle store), and various other smaller buildings used primarily for rifle and first aid training. Situated approximately two miles from Oundle, outside the hamlet of Elmington on the Ashton estate, is Oundle School’s full bore outdoor range. There is another, smaller .22 shooting range situated next to the school armoury which is used for day to day use.
 The Great Hall was constructed in 1908, with the North and South Wings added shortly afterwards. The Great Hall is located prominently in the centre of the town adjacent to the Cloisters and School House; it is used for a variety of functions throughout the year including concerts, receptions, lectures, debates and assemblies. The building also houses the offices of the Headmaster and the school admissions department. 
 The Chapel of Saint Anthony, consecrated in 1923, was built as a memorial to the fallen of the First World War. It contains some of the most important and influential stained glass in the country including the John Piper windows of 1954. The Chapel is where the school community meets. It links past and present, and bears witness, both in itself and in its art and worship, to the abiding values of the Christian Faith. The chapel houses two organs, a classical instrument built in 1984 by Frobenius of Denmark has three manuals and pedals, thirty-five speaking stops and mechanical action. It is situated in the Gallery at the West end. An electronic instrument installed by Copeman Hart in 2000 and situated at the East end of the Chapel provides accompaniment for the Chapel Choir, and leads the whole school singing. It has three manuals and pedals with a West end solo division.
 The Yarrow Gallery is the school's private art gallery, donated in 1918 by the shipbuilder Sir Alfred Yarrow in memory of his son, Eric, who was killed at the Second Battle of Ypres. The gallery puts on approximately half a dozen exhibitions every year. The space is adaptable and suitable for activities such as poetry readings, plays and small concerts as well as exhibitions. The purpose of the museum is that it should house a collection of pictures, specimens and models to illustrate "the history, development and beauty of the various branches of knowledge". The genealogical tree of the aeroplane and the Durham miner were charted and exhibits such as the skeleton of the white horse which used to draw the School ambulance to the Sanatorium were featured. The statue by Kathleen Scott entitled "Here Am I, Send Me" is erroneously held to be modelled on her son Peter Scott.
 The Stahl Theatre opened in 1980 and runs from a converted church on West Street; it can seat an audience of over 400. The Stahl Theatre is owned and managed by Oundle School, run by the Drama Department staff, many of whom have a professional theatre background. It houses both the School productions and visiting professional theatre companies.
 The Patrick Engineering Centre specialises in design technology, automobile engineering and other manual crafts. The school has had a strong reputation for science and engineering since the days of F. W. Sanderson, and this is reflected in the excellent facilities and equipment located within these buildings. Opened in 1998 after a generous donation from an old boy, the Patrick Centre plays an important role in the academic and extra-curricular activities of many pupils. Year after year Oundelians continue to build cars and other forms of automobile, the parts of which are manufactured almost entirely in the workshops.
 The Cripps Library was opened in 1988. It houses approximately 22,000 books encompassing all subjects. The Library is staffed throughout the school day and is open to the whole school for research, information or borrowing for academic work and leisure reading. The library was completely refurbished in 2011, with study spaces named in honour of inspirational former teachers at the school. The Peter Ling Room houses the new display cabinets for the Greek pots, the Dudley Heesom Room has been equipped with computer projection facilities for classes and meetings, the Rare Book Room now houses the rare book collection in sycamore cabinets. 
 School Archive is located in the old stables at Cobthorne House. It conserves an increasingly wide-ranging collection of photographs, newspaper cuttings, publications and record books relating to the school's history, the most notable being the earliest register of pupils of 1626.
 OSCAR Radio. The school houses its own radio station which broadcasts from newly converted studios in the Gascoigne Building. Over 2000 pupils and local children have taken part in OSCAR broadcasts since 1998.
 SciTec. The first phase of a new science and technology centre was completed in summer 2007. In September 2007 it was officially opened by the Duke of Gloucester. The project in total cost around £20 million in total. SciTec was the School's millennium project which upon completion was intended to create a distinctive, new centre to combine the Sciences, Art and Design and Technology. The first stage houses the Chemistry and Biology departments. In 2016, the sci-tec building was extended to house the maths department on the ground floor and first floor, including laboratories for students to use to conduct their own experiments for an EPQ. The Patrick Engineering Centre for Design, Engineering and Technology opened in the same year, marking the completion of the project.

Houses

The school has 14 boarding houses in total. There are eight boys' boarding houses (Bramston, Crosby, Fisher [formerly Laxton House], Grafton, Laundimer, School, Sidney and St Anthony), five girls' boarding houses (Dryden, Kirkeby, New House, Sanderson and Wyatt) and one junior house (The Berrystead). Laxton House (formerly Laxton School) caters solely for day pupils and the junior day house, Scott House, caters solely for 1st to 2nd day form pupils.

Oundle's Boarding Houses differ greatly in character, customs, and traditions and there has always been a rivalry between them. House Masters and Mistresses live with their families in private accommodation located within the boarding houses. The House Master/Mistress plays a role in the every day running of the house and is supported by a deputy as well as a head of house and a team of prefects from the sixth form. In addition, each house has a number of house tutors who take care of approximately eight pupils each. Each house also has a resident matron who cares for the unwell and plays an important pastoral and administrative role within the house. Student accommodation varies between houses, most houses contain a mixture of dormitories and bed-sits which are usually allocated according to seniority. Each house has its own library, computer room, recreation room, and dining room as well as living facilities such as kitchens, bathrooms and changing rooms.

The Boarding Houses are divided into two categories, Town and Field. The Town Houses front onto Oundle's central streets and have extensive grounds at the rear. The buildings were converted from a mixture of large private residences and shops and as such tend to possess individual, sometimes even labyrinthine layouts. The Field Houses provide accommodation in grand buildings which were purpose-built (mostly around the time of Sanderson) and are located slightly further from the town among the sports pitches and the school's other recreational facilities.

Boys' houses

Girls' houses

Junior house

Day house

Old Oundelians

Former pupils are known as Old Oundelians and the Old Oundelians Club (known as the OO Club) was founded in 1883.

Alumni of the school include Professor Maxwell Hutchinson, Past President of the Royal Institute of British Architects, Supreme Court Justices of the United Kingdom David Richards, and David Kitchin, rock musician Bruce Dickinson, England rugby players (and twins) Tom Curry and Ben Curry, architect Christopher Alexander, celebrated feminist campaigner, researcher and writer Caroline Criado-Perez and evolutionary biologist and science writer Richard Dawkins.

Victoria Cross winners
Three Old Oundelians were awarded the Victoria Cross for actions during the First World War:
Alan Jerrard VC
Cecil Leonard Knox VC
Charles Geoffrey Vickers VC

Notable Heads

F. W. Sanderson (Headmaster b.1857 d.1922)
Dr Ralph Townsend
Henry Reade
Barry Trapnell

Notable masters

F. W. Sanderson (Headmaster b.1857 d.1922)
Dr Ralph Townsend
John Olver (England Rugby International)
Simon Hodgkinson (England Rugby International)
Daniel Grewcock MBE (England Rugby International)
John Crawley (England Cricket player), teaches History
Kevin Walton GC DSC taught workshop engineering at the school
Terry Cobner (Wales and British Lions rugby union player)
Barry Trapnell, Headmaster from 1967 to 1984. 
W. G. Grace Jnr (eldest son of W. G. Grace)
 Ian Hepburn (190274), botanist, ecologist and author. Master for 39 years; Housemaster of Laxton House; Second Master; retired 1964. The Hepburn Music Competition is named after him.
David Carpanini taught Art at the school.
Sarah Kerr-Dineen, former Warden of Forest School, current Headmistress. 
Douglas Robb (born 1970), a housemaster at the school, was later head of Oswestry and Gresham's
Henry Reade (1840–1844), cricketer and headmaster from 1874–1884.
W. Sydney Robinson, history master and biographer.

School song
The official school song is Carmen Undeliense (words by R.F. Patterson, music by Clement M. Spurling, published in 1912 by Novello & Company Ltd of London).

References

Further reading 
 
Black, Edward "The Avondale Case" Lulu, Amazon, B&W  March 2014

External links

Oundle School
Profile at the Good Schools Guide
ISI Inspection Reports
Ofsted Boarding Inspection Reports

Boarding schools in Northamptonshire
Educational institutions established in the 1550s
Private schools in North Northamptonshire
Oundle
1556 establishments in England
Member schools of the Headmasters' and Headmistresses' Conference